New Diana High School is a public high school located in the unincorporated community of Diana, Texas in Upshur County, United States and classified as a 3A school by the UIL. It is a part of the New Diana Independent School District located in eastern Upshur County. In 2013, the school was rated "Met Standard" by the Texas Education Agency.

Athletics
The New Diana Eagles compete in these sports 

Baseball
Basketball
Cross Country
Football
Soccer
Golf
Powerlifting
Softball
Tennis
Track and Field
Volleyball

State Titles
One Act Play 
1996(2A), 1999(2A), 2000(2A), 2004(2A) 
UIL Texas State Marching Band Contest Finialists 2013(2A) 2017(3A)

2015-2016 TMEA 3A Honor Band

2017-2018 Sweepstakes Band

References

External links
New Diana ISD

Public high schools in Texas
Schools in Upshur County, Texas